is a Japanese manga series written by Eiji Ōtsuka and illustrated by Shou Tajima. Originally published from 1987 to 1994, it is set in a mythological era in Japan and tells the story of Madara, a goodhearted teenage boy who uses fantastic prosthetic limbs called "gimmicks" and a legendary sword to fight his own father, the evil overlord Miroku. The franchise has also spawned video games and a two-part OVA.

Media

Anime
A two-episode OVA directed by Yuji Moriyama was released in 1991.

Video games
The Famicom video game Mōryō Senki MADARA was a Konami 1990 release that was never localized. It was large for its time at 4 megabits, and used the "VRC6" sound enhancement mapper chip that was also used in Akumajō Densetsu, the Japanese version of Castlevania III: Dracula's Curse. It differed from the Final Fantasy and Dragon Quest RPGs of the time in that it had movement around battlefields rather than stationary turn-by-turn movements. An orchestrated soundtrack was released by Konami's KuKeiHa CLUB on April 21, 1990.

A sequel to the Famicom Madara, Mōryō Senki MADARA 2, was released for the Super Famicom in 1993. It was released on a 12-megabit cartridge.

Also in 1993, the PC-98 title Mōryō Senki Madara: Daikongō Rinhen was developed and published by Kogado Studio.

Finally, the spin-off RPG game Madara Saga: Yōchien Senki Madara was released for the Super Famicom by Datam Polystar in 1996. It is a comedic adaption that portrays the heroes as kindergarteners.

Volumes

Mōryō Senki MADARA

Original release
<onlyinclude>

1993 - 1994 Re-Release
Released as 
<onlyinclude>

1996 Re-Release
<onlyinclude>

Mōryō Senki MADARA: BASARA
Originally serialized as

Original Release
<onlyinclude>

1997 Re-Release
<onlyinclude>

Mōryō Senki MADARA: LASA

Original Release
<onlyinclude>

1996 - 1997 Re-Release
<onlyinclude>

MADARA: Tensei-Hen
<onlyinclude>

1997 Re-Release
<onlyinclude>

Notes

References

External links
 CMX summary page
 
 Review of MADARA for Famicom (French)

1987 manga
1991 anime OVAs
CMX (comics) titles
Shōnen manga
Studio Fantasia

fr:Madara